Leonid Nikitovich Khrushchev (10 November 1917 – 11 March 1943) was the son of Nikita Khrushchev, former leader of the Soviet Union, and served as a fighter pilot in the Soviet Air Forces during the World War II. He was shot down and killed in 1943, but the exact circumstances of his death remain unknown.

Early life
Leonid Khrushchev was born to Nikita Khrushchev and his first wife, Yefrosinia Pisareva. He graduated from high school and afterwards went to work in a factory. During high school, he received two reprimands from Komsomol (the youth division of the Communist Party of the Soviet Union): one for drunkenness and lack of discipline, the other for failure to pay for membership fees.

Air force career
In 1935, Leonid Khrushchev joined the Soviet Air Force as a fighter pilot.

During World War II, Khrushchev was part of the 134th Bomber Aviation Regiment, 46th Air Division, stationed in the Andreapol, Kalinin Oblast. He saw action in the Winter War against Finland, in which he completed over thirty combat missions and bombed the Mannerheim Line; after the war was finished on 13 March 1940, he volunteered to stay at the front. During the summer of 1941, he completed twelve combat missions and was presented with the Order of the Red Banner. On July 26, Khrushchev's plane was hit by German fighters near Moscow forcing him to crash land. He was hospitalized with a broken leg wherein the bone protruding through his boot. A doctor wanted to amputate until he threatened the doctor with a pistol. After recovery, his injured leg was shorter than the other. During his recovery in Kuibyshev, he associated with Rubén Ruiz Ibárruri. Impatient while idle, he would shoot bottles on friends' heads and killed one drunken naval officer by accident. Although court martialled, he was allowed to return to be a fighter pilot again.

Disappearance
On 11 March 1943, Khrushchev's plane, a YaK-7B fighter, was shot down, with Khrushchev presumably being killed. The pilots of his squadron saw his plane explode and disintegrate in the air after being hit by Focke Fw 190's fire, allegedly while attempting to shield another pilot with his own plane. However, even though the area of his approximate crash was under partisans control, and several planes attempted to locate his plane's wreckage on the next night, his body was never found. This, together with the fact that his father was already a member of the Politburo and one of the most important political figures in the country, gave birth to a number of conspiracy theories about the circumstances of his death.

Two months after his disappearance, he was posthumously awarded with the Order of the Patriotic War.

See also
 List of unsolved deaths

References

Bibliography
 
 The Lost Khrushchev: A Journey into the Gulag of the Russian Mind. By Nina Khrushcheva. Tate Publishing; 320 pages;

1917 births
1943 deaths
Aviators killed by being shot down
Burials at Novodevichy Cemetery
Missing in action of World War II
Missing person cases in Russia
Khrushchev family
Recipients of the Order of the Red Banner
Soviet Air Force officers
Soviet military personnel killed in World War II
Soviet World War II pilots
Unsolved deaths
Aerial disappearances of military personnel in action